Enaeta is a genus of sea snails, marine gastropod mollusks in the family Volutidae.

Description
The small shell has an ovate to fusiform shape. The protoconch is small and smooth. The teleoconch is covered with axial ribs. There is a conspicuous tooth-like blunt nodule on the midpoint of the outer lip. The radula is uniserial with an interlocking central cusp.

Distribution
This species occurs from the Caribbean Sea to the Atlantic Ocean south to Brazil and Fernando de Noronha Islands.

Species
Species within the genus Enaeta include:
 Enaeta barnesii (Gray, 1825)
 Enaeta cumingii (Broderip, 1832)
 Enaeta cylleniformis (Sowerby I, 1844)
 Enaeta guildingii (Sowerby I, 1844)
 Enaeta leonardhilli Petuch, 1982
 Enaeta reevei (Dall, 1907)

References

 Bail, P & Poppe, G. T. 2001. A conchological iconography: a taxonomic introduction of the recent Volutidae. Hackenheim-Conchbook, 30 pp, 5 pl

External links

Volutidae